A branched-chain amino acid (BCAA) is an amino acid having an aliphatic side-chain with a branch (a central carbon atom bound to three or more carbon atoms). Among the proteinogenic amino acids, there are three BCAAs: leucine, isoleucine, and valine. Non-proteinogenic BCAAs include 2-aminoisobutyric acid.

The three proteinogenic BCAAs are among the nine essential amino acids for humans, accounting for 35% of the essential amino acids in muscle proteins and 40% of the preformed amino acids required by mammals. Synthesis for BCAAs occurs in all locations of plants, within the plastids of the cell, as determined by presence of mRNAs which encode for enzymes in the metabolic pathway.

BCAAs fill several metabolic and physiologic roles.  Metabolically, BCAAs promote protein synthesis and turnover, signaling pathways, and metabolism of glucose. Oxidation of BCAAs may increase fatty acid oxidation and play a role in obesity. Physiologically, BCAAs take on roles in the immune system and in brain function. BCAAs are broken down effectively by dehydrogenase and decarboxylase enzymes expressed by immune cells, and are required for lymphocyte growth and proliferation and cytotoxic T lymphocyte activity. Lastly, BCAAs share the same transport protein into the brain with aromatic amino acids (Trp, Tyr, and Phe).  Once in the brain BCAAs may have a role in protein synthesis, synthesis of neurotransmitters, and production of energy.

Requirements
The Food and Nutrition Board (FNB) of the U.S. Institute of Medicine set Recommended Dietary Allowances (RDAs) for essential amino acids in 2002. For leucine, for adults 19 years and older, 42 mg/kg body weight/day; for isoleucine 19 mg/kg body weight/day; for valine 24 mg/kg body weight/day. For a 70 kg (154 lb) person this equates to 2.9, 1.3 and 1.7 g/day. Diets that meet or exceed the RDA for total protein (0.8 g/kg/day; 56 grams for a 70 kg person), meet or exceed the RDAs for branched-chain amino acids.

Research

Dietary BCAAs have been used in an attempt to treat some cases of hepatic encephalopathy. They can have the effect of alleviating symptoms of hepatic encephalopathy, but there is no evidence they benefit mortality rates, nutrition, or overall quality of life as further research is necessary.

Certain studies suggested a possible link between a high incidence of amyotrophic lateral sclerosis (ALS) among professional American football players and Italian soccer players, and certain sports supplements including BCAAs. In mouse studies, BCAAs were shown to cause cell hyper-excitability resembling that usually observed in ALS patients. The proposed underlying mechanism is that cell hyper-excitability results in increased calcium absorption by the cell and thus brings about cell death, specifically of neuronal cells which have particularly low calcium buffering capabilities.
Yet any link between BCAAs and ALS remains to be fully established. While BCAAs can induce a hyperexcitability similar to the one observed in mice with ALS, current work does not show if a BCAA-enriched diet, given over a prolonged period, actually induces ALS-like symptoms.

Blood levels of the BCAAs are elevated in obese, insulin resistant humans and in mouse and rat models of diet-induced diabetes, suggesting the possibility that BCAAs contribute to the pathogenesis of obesity and diabetes. BCAA-restricted diets improve glucose tolerance and promote leanness in normal weight mice, restores insulin sensitivity and normal body weight to obese mice and promotes insulin sensitivity in obese rats. In lean and obese mice, these benefits of BCAA-restriction are mediated by isoleucine and valine, and not by restriction of leucine.

In flies restriction of dietary BCAAs extends lifespan, while restriction of BCAAs in mice extends male lifespan and decreased frailty, but does not extend female lifespan. In mice, dietary supplementation with BCAAs alone decreases lifespan and promotes obesity. However, consumption of a BCAA-enriched essential amino acid supplement extends the lifespan of mice.

Synthesis

Five enzymes play a major role in the parallel synthesis pathways for isoleucine, valine, and leucine: threonine dehydrogenase, acetohydroxyacid synthase, ketoacid reductoisomerase, dihydroxyacid dehydrogenase and aminotransferase. Threonine dehydrogenase catalyzes the deamination and dehydration of threonine to 2-ketobutyrate and ammonia.  Isoleucine forms a negative feedback loop with threonine dehydrogenase.  Acetohydroxyacid synthase is the first enzyme for the parallel pathway performing condensation reaction in both steps – condensation of pyruvate to acetolactate in the valine pathway and condensation of pyruvate and 2-ketobutyrate to form acetohydroxybutyrate in the isoleucine pathway.  Next ketoacid reductoisomerase reduces the acetohydroxy acids from the previous step to yield dihydroxyacids in both the valine and isoleucine pathways.  Dihydroxyacid dehydrogenase converts the dihyroxyacids in the next step.  The final step in the parallel pathway is conducted by amino transferase, which yields the final products of valine and isoleucine. A series of four more enzymes – isopropylmalate synthase, isopropylmalate isomerase, isopropylmalate dehydrogenase, and aminotransferase – are necessary for the formation of leucine from 2-oxolsovalerate.

Degradation

Degradation of branched-chain amino acids involves the branched-chain alpha-keto acid dehydrogenase complex (BCKDH). A deficiency of this complex leads to a buildup of the branched-chain amino acids (leucine, isoleucine, and valine) and their toxic by-products in the blood and urine, giving the condition the name maple syrup urine disease. On the other hand, unchecked activity of this complex causes branched-chain keto acid dehydrogenase kinase deficiency.

The BCKDH complex converts branched-chain amino acids into acyl-CoA derivatives, which after subsequent reactions are converted either into acetyl-CoA or succinyl-CoA that enter the citric acid cycle.

Enzymes involved are branched chain aminotransferase and 3-methyl-2-oxobutanoate dehydrogenase.

Maple syrup urine disease

In a rat model of maple syrup urine disease, acute administration of BCAAs increases DNA damage in the hippocampus region of the brain. The nearby Figure shows the degradation pathway of BCAAs and specifically the key role of inadequate BCKDH in maple syrup urine disease.  Chronic administration of BCAAs, compared to acute administration, increased DNA damage not only in the hippocampus but also in the striatum region of the brain.  Antioxidant treatment was able the prevent the DNA damage in these brain regions, suggesting that the BCAAs cause DNA damage through the production of oxidative stress.

Cell signaling

While most amino acids are oxidized in the liver, BCAAs are primarily oxidized in the skeletal muscle and other peripheral tissues. The effects of BCAA administration on muscle growth in rat diaphragm was tested, and concluded that not only does a mixture of BCAAs alone have the same effect on growth as a complete mixture of amino acids, but an amino acid mixture with all but BCAAs has no effect on rat diaphragm muscle growth. Administration of either isoleucine or valine alone had no effect on muscle growth, although administration of leucine alone appears to be nearly as effective as the complete mixture of BCAAs.  Leucine indirectly activates p70 S6 kinase as well as stimulates assembly of the eIF4F complex, which are essential for mRNA binding in translational initiation. P70 S6 kinase is part of the mammalian target of rapamycin complex (mTOR) signaling pathway, and has been shown to allow adaptive hypertrophy and recovery of rat muscle. At rest protein infusion stimulates protein synthesis 30 minutes after start of infusion, and protein synthesis stays elevated for another 90 minutes. Infusion of leucine at rest produces a six-hour stimulatory effect and increased protein synthesis by phosphorylation of p70 S6 kinase in skeletal muscles. Following resistance exercise, without BCAA administration, a resistance exercise session does not affect mTOR phosphorylation and even produces a decrease in Akt phosphorylation. Some phosphorylation of p70 S6 kinase was discovered. When BCAAs were administered following a training session, sufficient phosphorylation of p70 S6 kinase and S6 indicated activation of the signaling cascade.

Role in diabetes mellitus type 2

In addition to cell signaling, the mTOR pathway also plays a role in beta cell growth leading to insulin secretion. High glucose in the blood begins the process of the mTOR signaling pathway, in which leucine plays an indirect role. The combination of glucose, leucine, and other activators cause mTOR to start signaling for the proliferation of beta cells and the secretion of insulin. Higher concentrations of leucine cause hyperactivity in the mTOR pathway, and S6 kinase is activated leading to inhibition of insulin receptor substrate through serine phosphorylation. In the cell the increased activity of mTOR complex causes eventual inability of beta cells to release insulin and the inhibitory effect of S6 kinase leads to insulin resistance in the cells, contributing to development of type 2 diabetes.

Metformin is able to activate AMP kinase which phosphorylates proteins involved in the mTOR pathway, as well as leads to the progression of mTOR complex from its inactive state to its active state. It is suggested that metformin acts as a competitive inhibitor to the amino acid leucine in the mTOR pathway.

Effects of BCAA supplementation on exercise 
BCAAs have an insulin-like effect on glucose, causing a reduction in glucose levels. BCAAs that are ingested before exercise can be oxidized by skeletal muscle and used as energy during the exercise, reducing the need for the liver to increase levels of glycogenolysis. During anaerobic exercise the pyruvate molecules that result from glucose metabolism are converted to lactic acid, the buildup of which can lead to metabolic acidosis with pH levels as low as 6.4. High levels of lactic acid cause glucose metabolism to stop in order to reduce further reduction of pH. BCAA supplementation has been shown to decrease levels of lactic acid in the muscle, allowing glucose metabolism to continue. This results in reduced rates of glycogenolysis in the liver and consequently lower plasma levels of glucose. However, studies done regarding long term effects of BCAAs on glucose levels have shown that consistent supplementation of BCAAs do not have a notable effect on blood glucose levels outside of exercise.

Recent studies have also shown that BCAAs reduce the levels of circulating free fatty-acids (FFA) in the blood. FFAs compete for binding sites on albumin with tryptophan, and when levels of FFAs in the blood are decreased, levels of free tryptophan also decrease as more is bound by albumin. During exercise, levels of free tryptophan entering the brain are increased, causing an increase in 5-hydroxytryptamine (5-HT, aka serotonin), a contributor to the sensation of fatigue. Through their reduction in levels of FFAs in the blood, BCAAs can help to reduce the levels of free tryptophan entering the brain, and help to reduce the sensation of fatigue as a result of exertion. The reduction in tryptophan uptake in the brain leads to a reduction in serotonin synthesis and release (in rats.) The reduction in serotonin can be as great as 90%; low levels of serotonin decrease sensations of fatigue, but also leads to a lack of focus, poor impulse control, aggressive behavior and poor planning.

BCAA also inhibits tyrosine uptake in the brain (tyrosine being another aromatic amino acid, like tryptophan); the reduced uptake depresses catecholamine synthesis and release in the brain. Catecholamines are associated with enhanced physical performance. The simultaneous reductions in both catecholamine and serotonin synthesis may account for the relatively neutral effect of BCAA on physical performance.

BCAAs are also found to reduce the increase in serum levels of ammonia that occurs during exercise. This is done by increasing the amount of ammonia used in glutamine synthesis, preventing an over-accumulation of ammonia in the blood. Increased levels of ammonia in the brain result in lower levels of GABA and glutamate, causing an increase in central fatigue. Increased levels of ammonia in the muscle tissue also increase phosphofructokinase activity (PFK), leading to an increase in lactic acid, a major contributor to muscle fatigue.

In addition, BCAA supplementation has been shown to decrease levels of creatine kinase in muscle cells post exercise. Creatine kinase is an indicator of muscle damage, and is responsible for transferring a phosphate group from ATP to create a phosphocreatine molecule. BCAA supplementation has been shown to decrease levels of creatine kinase, leading to higher levels of intracellular ATP and a lessened sense of fatigue. See also DOMS.

See also 
 Branched-chain alpha-keto acid dehydrogenase complex
 Maple syrup urine disease - excessive accumulation of BCAA in the organism
 BCKDK deficiency - insufficient levels of BCAA in the organism

References

External links 

 
 Branched-chain amino acid degradation pathway
 Synthesic pathway in yeast (WikiPathways)